Hinton Rowan Helper (December 27, 1829 – March 9, 1909), from North Carolina, was a writer, abolitionist, and white supremacist. In 1857, he published a book that he dedicated to the "nonslaveholding whites" of the South. Titled The Impending Crisis of the South: How to Meet It and written partly in North Carolina but published when the author was in the Northern United States, it argued that slavery hurt the economic prospects of non-slaveholders and was an impediment to the growth of the entire region of the South. Anger over his book due to the belief he was acting as an agent of the North attempting to split Southerners along class lines led to Southern denunciations of "Helperism."

Biography
Helper "(originally Helfer: his grandfather had come from Heidelberg)" was born near Mocksville, North Carolina. He was the son of a small slave-owning farmer in Western North Carolina. His father died before Helper was a year old, but he was cared for by a wealthy extended family and obtained a good education with the financial help of his uncle. He graduated from Mocksville Academy in 1848 and went to California in 1851 hoping to get rich, but he came back in 1854, disillusioned.

In 1855 Helper wrote the book The Land of Gold. Reality versus Fiction, in which he said "that slave labor was less profitable than free labor and in Baltimore, where the book was to be published, he had run into a Maryland statute, dating from 1831, which made it a felony with a penalty of not less than ten years in jail knowingly to write or print anything 'having a tendency to excite discontent ... amongst the people of color....' Compelled to excise these comments, Hinton Helper — an irascible man — resolved to speak out his whole mind in a book devoted entirely to this subject." The book was The Impending Crisis of the South: How to Meet It. Expressing Helper's deep opposition to slavery and the condition of Southern culture and the South's lack of economic progress, it was one of the most effective criticisms of the South. Helper argued that the South's growth, prosperity, and cultural development were being held back by slavery. He deployed statistics from the census to show that land values, literacy levels, and manufacturing rates were considerably lower in the South than in the North. He warned of the devastation caused by slavery through deforestation. He proposed that slaveholders be taxed to colonize all free blacks in Africa or Latin America.

The success of The Impending Crisis in the South made Helper famous overnight. It also heightened the political crisis by raising fears among Southerners that poor landless Southern whites might turn against slavery if they saw that it did not benefit them. The fear of class divisions within the white community was enough to lead many Southerners who had previously been opponents of secession to embrace it after the election of Abraham Lincoln.

After the war, Helper appeared as a post-war Fire Eater, urging the wholesale expulsion of former slaves. He believed the United States should be exclusively white (also excluding Chinese, Native Americans, and other non-white groups). "A. B. Burdick, the publisher of The Impending Crisis, testified that Helper ... avoided all contacts with Negroes, refusing even to patronize hotels or restaurants which employed Negroes in menial capacities. Another man who knew Helper before the war recalled that 'he has always been inflexibly opposed to all the relations and conditions which have kept the two races close together; and this ... was one of the principal grounds of his opposition to slavery." Nevertheless, Southern enemies of Reconstruction were unwilling to forgive his previous opposition to slavery, and he remained a marginal and increasingly unstable character in postwar America.

Lincoln appointed Helper as United States consul in Buenos Aires from 1861 to 1866. He spent most of the postwar years promoting a scheme to build an intercontinental railroad connecting North and South America, which would help replace black and brown peoples with whites. The "Three Americas Railway" was supposed to extend from the Bering Sea to the Strait of Magellan. His schemes never came to anything, and he committed suicide by turning on the gas in his Washington, D.C. apartment.

The Impending Crisis of the South

The book, which was a combination of statistical charts and provocative prose, attracted little attention until 1859 when it was widely reprinted in a condensed volume called the Compendium by Northern opponents of slavery. Helper concluded that slavery hurt the Southern economy overall by preventing economic development and industrialization and was the main reason why the South had progressed so much less than the North (according to the results of the 1850 census). Helper spoke on behalf of the majority of Southern whites of moderate means—the Plain Folk of the Old South—who he said were oppressed by a small but politically dominant aristocracy of wealthy slave-owners.

The reaction in the South was very negative. John Spencer Bassett studied the issue and observed in 1898 that circulating Helper's book could be the basis of criminal charges.  Politicians often accused each other of having read it, but many of the most successful politicians read it and used its observations of the negative effects of slavery as the basis of their attempts to solve some of the problems Helper pointed out slavery caused. In his 1867 essay, "War of races. By whom it is sought to be brought about. Considered in two letters, with copious extracts from the recent work of Hilton R. Helper," John Harmer Gilmer calls Helper "a profane miscreant," one of many insults directed at Helper in that essay.

There are very few references to blacks in the book, and certainly slavery as an economic institution is denounced, not black people. It generated a furor in the South, where authorities banned its possession and distribution and burned copies that could be seized. Between 1857 and 1861, nearly 150,000 copies of the book were circulated, and in 1860, the Republican party distributed it as a campaign document. In December 1859, Democrats returning to Congress reacted with indignation because 68 Republicans had endorsed the book and planned to use it as campaign literature in the presidential election of 1860. Opponents blocked the election of Republican John Sherman as speaker because he had endorsed the book.

Tributes

The Hinton Rowan Helper House was Helper's residence, 1829–49, and is a designated National Historic Landmark.
Liberty ship SS Hinton R. Helper. See List of Liberty ships (G–Je)

Primary sources

Helper's Works

Various editions of The Impending Crisis
1857 text of  The Impending Crisis at the University of North Carolina
 Compendium of the Impending Crisis of the South: How to Meet It (1859 version online)
 The Impending Crisis of the South: How to Meet It (1860 edition)  online version
 The Impending Crisis of the South: How to Meet It (1968). Fredrickson, George M., ed. and author of a 55-page introduction. Cambridge, Massachusetts: The Belknap Press of Harvard University Press.
 Nojoque:  A Question of a Continent (1867)
 
   Noonday Exigencies in America (1871) online
   Oddments of Andean Diplomacy, and other oddment (1879) online
 The Three Americas Railway (1881)

Works by other authors
War of races. By whom it is sought to be brought about. Considered in two letters, with copious extracts from the recent work of Hilton R. Helper. by John Harmer Gilmer (1867)
A Book for the impending Crisis! Appeal to the common sense and patriotism of the people of the United States.  Helperism Annihilated! The "irrepressible conflict" and its consequences! by Louis Schade of Iowa, 1860

Further reading
American National Biography, (2000)  sub Helper.
 Bailey, Hugh C. (1965) Hinton Rowan Helper: Abolitionist-Racist. University of Alabama Press. Review, pp. 410-411
 Brown, David. Attacking Slavery from Within: The Making of The Impending Crisis of the South, Journal of Southern History, August 2004 JSTOR)
 Brown, David. Southern Outcast: Hinton Rowan Helper and The Impending Crisis of the South, 2006
 Cardoso, J. J. "Hinton Rowan Helper as a Racist in the Abolitionist Camp," The Journal of Negro History, Vol. 55, No. 4 (October 1970), pp. 323–330 in JSTOR
 Channing, Steven A. Crisis of Fear: Secession in South Carolina (1974) online pp. 104-5
 Frederickson, George M. "Antislavery Racist: Hinton Rowan Helper,"  in Fredrickson, The Arrogance of Race: Historical Perspectives on Slavery, Racism, and Social Inequality (1988), ch. 2 (pp. 28-53)
 Wilson, Edmund.  Patriotic Gore: Studies in the Literature of the American Civil War, New York, Oxford University Press, 1962, pp. 364-379.

See also
Fire-Eaters, pro slavery Southerners.
Arthur Kemp, who wrote an essay, "The Lie of Apartheid", which argued that apartheid was in fact an impracticable and unworkable system which led directly to the Afrikaners' demise as a political force in that country.
William E. Stevenson, accused of sedition against the state for circulating Helper's book 
The Redneck Manifesto, a book discussing what the author claims is the disenfranchisement of lower-class White people.

References

External links 
 Helper, Hinton R. - NCpedia biography of Helper, State Library of North Carolina
 
 
 About.com Article  Possible broken link
 Capsule biography

1829 births
1909 suicides
People from Mocksville, North Carolina
People of the California Gold Rush
American abolitionists
American political writers
American male non-fiction writers
Suicides by gas
Suicides in Washington, D.C.
American white supremacists
1909 deaths